Bongek is a mukim in Rembau District, Negeri Sembilan, Malaysia.

References

Mukims of Negeri Sembilan
Rembau District